Najma Haque (known as Shanta Islam) is a Bangladeshi film and television actress, anchor, and director. She was awarded Bangladesh National Film Award for Best Supporting Actress for her role in the film Onno Jibon. Shanta has directed 25 television dramas and acted in many TV dramas.

Early life and career
Islam was born and brought up in Sylhet. She started her acting career at the theatre and television media in 1985 when she was a student at the University of Dhaka. She was elected Literary Editor of Rokeya Hall twice.

Islam debuted her acting on television with the play Abhijog opposite Syed Ahsan Ali Sydney and on theater with Juddha Ebong Juddha.

After joining Aranyak Natyadal, she won the Best Actor at the BACHSUS Awards for the play, Moyurshinghashon.

Islam hosted several television shows.

Works

Drama

Films

References

External links

Living people
University of Dhaka alumni
Bangladeshi film actresses
Bangladeshi television actresses
Bangladeshi stage actresses
Bangladeshi television presenters
Best Supporting Actress National Film Award (Bangladesh) winners
Year of birth missing (living people)
Bangladeshi women television presenters